Nongthombam Denin (born 1 January 1997) is an Indian cricketer. He made his Twenty20 debut on 17 January 2021, for Manipur in the 2020–21 Syed Mushtaq Ali Trophy. He made his List A debut on 27 February 2021, for Manipur in the 2020–21 Vijay Hazare Trophy.

References

External links
 

1997 births
Living people
Indian cricketers
Manipur cricketers
Place of birth missing (living people)